Philip Hyde (born 1957), Sydney, New South Wales) is an Australian former actor. After graduating the Victorian College of Arts, he became best known for playing the sinister Rodney Adams during the final year's run (1986) of the television series Prisoner. He also appeared in the long running Australian soap opera A Country Practice.

Hyde has also appeared on stage in productions including the Australian and New Zealand tours of Michael Frayn's award winning comedy Noises Off and Ray Cooney's comedy, Run For Your Wife.

Filmography

References

Australian male soap opera actors
Australian male stage actors
Living people
1958 births
20th-century Australian male actors